The Taiwan Open is a professional women's tennis tournament played on indoor hard courts in Taipei, Taiwan. The tournament began in 2016 and was held in Kaohsiung, Taiwan for its first year. The event is affiliated with the Women's Tennis Association (WTA) and is an International-level tournament on the WTA Tour. The Taiwan Open is being discontinued from the 2019 season, with the Hua Hin Championships replacing its slot on the calendar.

Results

Singles

Doubles

See also
 List of sporting events in Taiwan

References

External links 
 

 
WTA Tour
Tennis tournaments in Taiwan
Hard court tennis tournaments
Recurring sporting events established in 2016
2016 establishments in Taiwan